Zoltán Wladár (born 5 January 1960) is a Hungarian former swimmer. He competed at the 1976 Summer Olympics and the 1980 Summer Olympics.

References

1960 births
Living people
Hungarian male swimmers
Olympic swimmers of Hungary
Swimmers at the 1976 Summer Olympics
Swimmers at the 1980 Summer Olympics
Swimmers from Budapest